Youngker High School (YHS) is a high school in Buckeye, Arizona under the jurisdiction of the Buckeye Union High School District. It opened its doors for the first freshman class in 2007.  The school opened under the guidance  of Principal Johnny Ray, who retired from education in May 2009.

The district named the school after the Youngker family, who donated the land that the high school sits upon.

Its roof sustained damage in the 2011 Phoenix dust storm, causing water damage to several classrooms. Debris shattered two windows.

In July 2017, Athletic Director Rob Roberson took over as the school's third principal.

In the 2020/21 school year, Ian Murillo became YHS's newest principal.

References

Public high schools in Arizona
Educational institutions established in 2007
Schools in Maricopa County, Arizona
2007 establishments in Arizona